Sir Dimitri Dimitrievich Obolensky    (–23 December 2001) was a Russian-British historian who was Professor of Russian and Balkan History at the University of Oxford and the author of various historical works.

Biography

Prince Dimitri Dimitrievich Obolensky was born in the Russian Soviet Republic on 1 April 1918 in Saint Petersburg, the son of Prince Dimitri Alexandrovich Obolensky (1882–1964) and Countess Maria (Shuvalova) (1894–1973).  His family was descended from Rurik, Igor, Svyatoslav, St Vladimir of Kiev, St Michael of Chernigov, and Prince Mikhail Semyonovich Vorontsov: however, as one of his students has written, "he was a sober enough scholar to know that Rurik may not actually have existed."

After the Russian Revolution, the Royal Navy helped the Obolensky family to escape from Russia in 1919, together with the Dowager Empress Marie Feodorovna and the Grand Duke Nicholas.  He was educated in Britain at Lynchmere Preparatory School, Eastbourne, and in France at the Lycée Pasteur in Neuilly-sur-Seine, before going up to Trinity College, Cambridge, where he distinguished himself with a Blue for lawn tennis and graduated in 1940.

Obolensky became a distinguished academic. He was elected a Fellow of Trinity College (1942–1948, Honorary Fellow 1991–2001) and Lecturer in Slavonic Studies, University of Cambridge (1946–1948). He became a British national in 1948.

From 1949 to 1961, Obolensky was Reader in Russian and Balkan Medieval History at the University of Oxford (1949–1961) and subsequently Professor of Russian and Balkan History (1961–1985, Emeritus 1985–2001). He was also a Student of Christ Church, Oxford (1950–1985, Emeritus 1985–2001). He later became Vice-President of the Keston Institute, Oxford.

Obolensky's most enduring achievement was The Byzantine commonwealth (1971), a large-scale synthesis on the cultural influence of the Eastern Roman Empire. Other major studies include The Bogomils: a study in Balkan neo-Manichaeism (1946) and Six Byzantine Portraits (1988).

Obolensky was elected a Fellow of the British Academy (1974, Vice-President 1983-85), as well as Fellow of the Society of Antiquaries, and appointed a Knight Bachelor (1984). He was a member of the Athenaeum.  In 1988, he returned to Russia as a delegate to the Sobor or Council of the Russian Orthodox Church convoked to celebrate the 1,000th anniversary of the conversion of Russia to Christianity. He was elected to the American Philosophical Society in 1990.

Obolensky married Elisabeth Lopukhin in 1947; they had no children, and the marriage was dissolved in 1989.

Sir Dimitri died on 23 December 2001 at Burford in Oxfordshire. His memorial service was held in Christ Church Cathedral, Oxford, and he is buried at Wolvercote Cemetery.

Selected works

References

External links
 Robin Milner-Gulland, 'Professor Sir Dimitri Obolensky, 1918-2002', Society for the Promotion of Byzantine Studies
 Burke's Peerage, Baronetage & Knightage

1918 births
2001 deaths
Burials at Wolvercote Cemetery
Dimitri
Fellows of Christ Church, Oxford
Alumni of Trinity College, Cambridge
Fellows of Trinity College, Cambridge
Fellows of the British Academy
Historians of Russia
British historians of religion
Historians of Europe
British Byzantinists
British medievalists
Knights Bachelor
White Russian emigrants to the United Kingdom
Fellows of the Society of Antiquaries of London
Lycée Pasteur (Neuilly-sur-Seine) alumni
Foreign Members of the Russian Academy of Sciences
20th-century British historians
British expatriates in France
Scholars of Byzantine history
Members of the American Philosophical Society